Rålambshovsparken (English: Rålambshov Park) is a park in the Marieberg district on the island of Kungsholmen   in Stockholm, Sweden.

Location
This park passes under a section of Västerbron. In the west, the park borders the Konradsberg campus of Stockholm University, in the east it extends toward promenade of Norr Mälarstrand  and to the south-east it opens onto Riddarfjärden.

Sculptures
Rålambshovsparken is home to several sculptures: Monument över Yxman by Eric Grate (1896-1983), Domarring by Egon Möller-Nielsen (1915-  1959), Fjärilen by Elli Hemberg and Färgtorn by Lars Erik Falk (1922-2018).

History 
The park opened in 1936 and was one of the first in Stockholm to be designed according to functionalist principles. It was designed by landscape architect Erik Glemme (1905-1959) and resembles the functionalist style popular in that era. In celebration of Stockholm's 700-year anniversary, an amphitheater was added in 1953, with capacity for 5,000 people.

Rålis Skatepark was inaugurated in 2010 under "Lilla Västerbron".

On 8th September 2018 Greta Thunberg announced in the park's theater at the beginning of the People's Climate March that, though her original three-week schoolstrike before the Swedish elections that were due the next day was ending, she and other students had decided to henceforth keep striking school and demanding climate justice every friday. The park is therefor the site of the founding of the movement Fridays for Future.

Gallery

See also 
 Geography of Stockholm

References

Parks in Stockholm